Jerry of the Circus was a 1937 syndicated radio serial broadcast for a juvenile audience. It was presented in 130 15-minute episodes of which 128 are in existence today. The series followed the adventures of Jerry Dougan and his dog Rags with the Randall Brothers Circus from the time of his father's death in the spring to the end of that year's performance season. Jerry Dougan's adventures continued in the 1937 serial Jerry at Fair Oaks.

Characters
Jerry Dougan – orphan who joins the Randall Brothers Circus when his father dies
Rags – Jerry's dog
Mr. Randall – owner of the Randall Brothers Circus (Lindsay McHarrie)
Bumps – the clown Jerry bunks with; recruits Jerry's dog Rags for his act (Howard McNear)
Patsy – the trapeze artist of the circus (Elvia Allman)
Jason – the large cat trainer
Carmen Bandini (voiced by actor who played the Girl Submarine Commander in Magic Island – tightrope walker who leaves the circus for Hollywood
Major Mike – the little person who regards himself as the star attraction on the midway (Buddy Duncan) 
Decker/Dan Dougan – the kindly circus performer who turns out to be Jerry's big-game hunter uncle suffering from amnesia
Lorenz – the knife-throwing performer who controls Decker through bribery
Clara – the costumer
Johnny Bradley – Shakespearean clown

See also
The Cinnamon Bear – another 1930s-era radio program intended for juvenile audiences
Land of the Lost – 1943–48 radio fantasy adventure
Magic Island – 1936 radio series about an orphan boy's adventures (not the same Jerry as in Jerry of the Circus)

Listen to

OTR Network Library: Jerry of the Circus (128 episodes)

External links
Jerry Haendiges Vintage Radio Logs: Jerry of the Circus
Jerry Haendiges Vintage Radio Logs: Jerry at Fair Oaks

American radio dramas
1937 radio programme debuts
1937 radio programme endings
American children's radio programs
Fiction set in circuses